A project finance model is a specialized financial model, the purpose of which is to assess the economic feasibility of the project in question. The model's output can also be used in structuring, or "sculpting", the project finance deal.

The context: project finance is the long-term financing of infrastructure and industrial projects based upon the projected cash flows of the project - rather than the balance sheets of its sponsors. The project is therefore only feasible when the project is capable of producing enough cash to cover all operating and debt-servicing expenses over the whole tenor of the debt. 

Most importantly, therefore, the model is used to determine the maximum amount of debt the project company (Special-purpose entity) can maintain - and the corresponding debt repayment profile; there are several related metrics here, the most important of which is arguably the Debt Service Coverage Ratio (DSCR).

Model structure
The general structure of any financial model is standard: (i) input (ii) calculation algorithm (iii) output; see Financial forecast. While the output for a project finance model is more or less uniform, and the calculation algorithm is predetermined by accounting rules, the input is highly project-specific. 
Generally, the model can be subdivided into the following categories:
 Variables needed for forecasting revenues
 Variables needed for forecasting expenses
 Capital expenditures
 Financing

A model is usually built for a most probable (or base) case. Then, a model sensitivity analysis is conducted to determine effects of changes in input variables on key outputs, such as internal rate of return (IRR), net present value (NPV) and payback period.

For discussion (i) re cash-flow modelling, see Valuation using discounted cash flows #Determine cash flow for each forecast period;
and (ii) re model "calibration", and sensitivity- and scenario analysis, see #Determine equity value.

Practically, these are usually built as Excel spreadsheets and then consist of the following interlinked sheets (see under the list for "Equity valuation" @ Outline of finance #Discounted cash flow valuation for further model-build items), with broad groupings:
Project build and operation (Data input):  operating assumptions; Capital costs (construction); Insurance; Taxes; Depreciation; Financing
Corresponding financial statements: Income statement; Balance sheet; Cash flow statement
Resultant project metrics: Retained earnings; Coverage ratios; Present values

Metrics in assessing a project
As stated above, the model is used to determine the most appropriate amount of debt the project company should take: in any year the debt service coverage ratio (DSCR) should not exceed a predetermined level. 
DSCR is also used as a measure of riskiness of the project and, therefore, as a determinant of interest rate on debt. Minimal DSCR set for a project depends on riskiness of the project, i.e. on predictability and stability of cash flow generated by it.  

Related to this is the Project life cover ratio (PLCR), the ratio of the net present value of the cash flow over the remaining full life of the project to the outstanding debt balance in the period. It is a measure of the number of times the cash flow over the life of the project can repay the outstanding debt balance. The Loan life cover ratio (LLCR), similarly is the ratio of the net present value of the cash flow over the scheduled life of the loan to the outstanding debt balance in the period. Other ratios of this sort include the Cash flow available for debt service (CFADS), Drawdown cover ratio (DCR), Historic debt service cover ratio (HDSCR), Projected debt service cover ratio (PDSCR), and the Repayment cover ratio (RCR).

Standard profitability metrics are also considered - most commonly, Internal rate of return (IRR), Return on assets (ROA), and Return on equity (ROE)

Debt sculpting 
Debt sculpting is common in the financial modelling of a project. It means that the principal repayment obligations have been calculated to ensure that the principal and interest obligations are appropriately matched to the strength and pattern of the cashflows in each period.
The most common ways to do so are to manually adjust the principal repayment in each period, or to algebraically solve the principal repayment to achieve a desired DSCR.
See Cashflow matching, Immunization (finance), Asset–liability mismatch.

What is the Debt Service Coverage Ratio (DSCR)?

The debt service coverage ratio (DSCR) is a financial metric that measures the ability of a project to generate enough cash flow to cover its debt service obligations, including principal and interest payments. A DSCR of 1.0x indicates that the project generates enough cash flow to cover its debt service obligations, while a DSCR above 1.0x indicates that the project generates more cash flow than required to cover its debt service obligations.

See also
Project finance
project risk management
power purchase agreement

References
 Penelope Lynch, Financial Modelling for Project Finance, 1997, .
 Renewables Valuation Institute, Debt Sizing with Target DSCR - Project Finance, https://courses.renewablesvaluationinstitute.com/pages/academy?p=debt-sizing-with-target-dscr
 Peter K Nevitt and Frank J. Fabozzi, Project Financing, 2000, 
 John Tjia, Building Financial Models, 2009, 

Corporate finance
Infrastructure investment
Valuation (finance)
Financial models